Gloiodon strigosus is a species of fungus belonging to the family Bondarzewiaceae.

It is native to Eurasia and America.

References

Russulales